Last Mountain-Touchwood is a provincial electoral district for the Legislative Assembly of Saskatchewan, Canada. Located in southern Saskatchewan, this constituency was created by combining the district of Last Mountain with part of the constituency of Touchwood.

Communities in the district include the towns of Strasbourg, Ituna, Lemberg, Southey, and Balcarres. Villages in the district include Punnichy, Kelliher, Lestock, Abernethy, Goodeve, Neudorf, and Lebret.

Members of the Legislative Assembly

Election results

|-

 
|NDP
|Don Jeworski
|align="right"|2,049
|align="right"|28.94
|align="right"|-1.91

|- bgcolor="white"
!align="left" colspan=3|Total
!align="right"|7,080
!align="right"|100.00
!align="right"|

|-

 
|NDP
|Jordon Hillier
|align="right"|2,419
|align="right"|30.85
|align="right"|-8.90

|- bgcolor="white"
!align="left" colspan=3|Total
!align="right"|7,842
!align="right"|100.00
!align="right"|

|-

 
|NDP
|Jordon Hillier
|align="right"|3,055
|align="right"|39.75
|align="right"|+3.92

|- bgcolor="white"
!align="left" colspan=3|Total
!align="right"|7,686
!align="right"|100.00
!align="right"|

|-

 
|NDP
|Dale Flavel
|align="right"|2,882
|align="right"|35.83
|align="right"|-10.33

|- bgcolor="white"
!align="left" colspan=3|Total
!align="right"|8,044
!align="right"|100.00
!align="right"|

|-
 
| style="width: 130px" |NDP
|Dale Flavel
|align="right"|3,711
|align="right"|46.16
|align="right"|-2.43

 
|Prog. Conservative
|Wesley Chamberlin
|align="right"|1,108
|align="right"|13.78
|align="right"|-16.66
|- bgcolor="white"
!align="left" colspan=3|Total
!align="right"|8,040
!align="right"|100.00
!align="right"|

|-
 
| style="width: 130px" |NDP
|Dale Flavel
|align="right"|4,028
|align="right"|48.59
|align="right"|+1.96
 
|Prog. Conservative
|Arnold Tusa
|align="right"|2,523
|align="right"|30.44
|align="right"|-17.25

|Independent
|Paul Chesterton
|align="right"|47
|align="right"|0.57
|align="right"|–
|- bgcolor="white"
!align="left" colspan=3|Total
!align="right"|8,289
!align="right"|100.00
!align="right"|

|-
 
| style="width: 130px" |Prog. Conservative
|Arnold Tusa
|align="right"|4,032
|align="right"|47.69
|align="right"|-3.12
 
|NDP
|Gordon MacMurchy
|align="right"|3,943
|align="right"|46.63
|align="right"|+1.68

|- bgcolor="white"
!align="left" colspan=3|Total
!align="right"|8,455
!align="right"|100.00
!align="right"|

|-
 
| style="width: 130px" |Prog. Conservative
|Arnold Tusa
|align="right"|4,588
|align="right"|50.81
|align="right"|+5.25
 
|NDP
|Gordon MacMurchy
|align="right"|4,059
|align="right"|44.95
|align="right"|-4.87

|- bgcolor="white"
!align="left" colspan=3|Total
!align="right"|9,030
!align="right"|100.00
!align="right"|

|-
 
| style="width: 130px" |NDP
|Gordon MacMurchy
|align="right"|4,150
|align="right"|49.82
|align="right"|+4.46
 
|Prog. Conservative
|Arnold Tusa
|align="right"|3,795
|align="right"|45.56
|align="right"|+13.59

|- bgcolor="white"
!align="left" colspan=3|Total
!align="right"|8,330
!align="right"|100.00
!align="right"|

|-
 
| style="width: 130px" |NDP
|Gordon MacMurchy
|align="right"|3,640
|align="right"|45.36
|align="right"|–
 
|Prog. Conservative
|Arnold Tusa
|align="right"|2,565
|align="right"|31.97
|align="right"|–

|- bgcolor="white"
!align="left" colspan=3|Total
!align="right"|8,024
!align="right"|100.00
!align="right"|

History

Members of the Legislative Assembly – Last Mountain

Members of the Legislative Assembly – Touchwood

References

External links 
Website of the Legislative Assembly of Saskatchewan
Saskatchewan Archives Board - Saskatchewan Election Results By Electoral District

Saskatchewan provincial electoral districts